Line Toft Hansen (born 31 July 1999) is a Danish professional golfer and member of the Ladies European Tour.

Early life and amateur career
Hansen started playing golf in 2007, taught by her grandfather. She played at Gilleleje Golf Club, where her parents owned the restaurant, and later switched to Hillerød Golf Club. Her brother, Morten Toft Hansen, is also a professional golfer. He won the 2018 Swedish PGA Championship. In 2013, they both won the AON Junior Tour III tournament, in the girls' and boys' category respectively.

Hansen won the Finnish International Championship (U16) in 2014. She was runner-up in the team event at the 2015 World Junior Girls Championship in Canada, and finished 10th individually. She was runner-up at the 2017 Portuguese International Ladies Amateur Championship and runner-up at the 2018 Turkish International Amateur Open Championship. In 2019, she was 3rd at the German International Amateur.

Professional career
Hansen turned professional in late 2019 and joined the 2020 Ladies European Tour with limited category. She started four tournaments and made two cuts. In 2021, she started more than a dozen tournaments and finished T4 in the team event at the Aramco Team Series – Sotogrande, teamed with Anne-Lise Caudal of France and Lee-Anne Pace of South Africa.

In 2020, Hansen also participated in seven tournaments on the Swedish Golf Tour over the summer, winning the Hagge Open held at Hagge Golf Club near Ludvika, Dalarna. This was enough to win the Order of Merit, albeit shared with Louise Rydqvist, and in the lesser domestic category excluding LET Access Series designated events. The main category was won by Linn Grant.

Amateur wins
2013 AON Junior Tour III
2014 Finnish International Championship (U16)
2016 DGU Elite Tour Damer Sæsonfinalen 
2017 Hotel Præstekilde Møn Open

Sources:

Professional wins (1)

Swedish Golf Tour wins (1)

Team appearances
Amateur
World Junior Girls Championship (representing Denmark): 2015
European Ladies' Team Championship (representing Denmark): 2016

References

External links

Line Toft Hansen at the World Amateur Golf Ranking official site

Danish female golfers
Ladies European Tour golfers
Sportspeople from the Capital Region of Denmark
People from Hillerød Municipality
1999 births
Living people